The 1977 World Table Tennis Championships women's doubles was the 33rd edition of the women's doubles championship.
Pak Yong-ok and Yang Ying defeated Chu Hsiang-Yun and Wei Li-Chieh in the final by three sets to one.

Results

See also
List of World Table Tennis Championships medalists

References

-
1977 in women's table tennis